Persatuan Sepak Bola Gianyar is an Indonesian football club based in Gianyar, Bali. They currently play in Liga 3. Their home stadium is Kapten I Wayan Dipta Stadium.

History
When club named Persegi Gianyar, the club hit by financial difficulties in 2005 and decided to dissolve the club. This led to an opportunity for other clubs from Bali to merge and form a club using Persegi Gianyar's license to compete in the Liga Indonesia. Local clubs such as Perseden Denpasar, Persekaba Badung and Perst Tabanan merged with Persegi Gianyar to form a new club called Persegi Bali FC.

In 2011, the club reborn with new name PS Gianyar and started in Third Division. In 2012 season, the club became runner-up of the Third Division and got promotion to Second Division.
In 2014, they play in Liga Nusantara, but fail to qualify for the national round.

Honours
Liga Indonesia Second Division
 Runners-up (1): 2012

Former players
 I Made Wardana
 Muhammad Fakhrudin
 Javier Roca

References

Football clubs in Indonesia
Football clubs in Bali
2011 establishments in Indonesia
Association football clubs established in 2011